Piotr Fast (born 1 November 1951, in Warsaw) is a Polish professor, historian of Russian literature, Translation Studies scholar and translator. He graduated in Russian Studies from the Adam Mickiewicz University in Poznan in 1975. For many years he was associated with the University of Silesia in Katowice where he was hired in 1975, obtained doctor's degree in 1980, habilitated doctor’s degree in 1987), academic title of professor (1995) and performed various executive functions (including deputy rector for Student Affairs – 1990-1993). In the years 2005-2010 he acted as  the rector of the College of Linguistics in Czestochowa. After that he was employed at the Tischner European University in Cracow and at the Faculty of Humanities and Social Sciences of the University of Technology and Humanities in Bielsko-Biala (2012-2014). In academic year 2014/15 he returned to the Institute of East Slavic Philology at the University of Silesia in Katowice.

He is the author of a dozen books on the history of Russian literature, co-author of the academic textbook Historia literatury rosyjskiej XX wieku (History of 20th Century Russian Literature) edited by Andrzej Drawicz and an editor of several dozen of collective works. He has published over 200 scientific and popular science articles, reviews, translations of scholarly texts and translations of Russian prose and poetry, including Iosif Brodsky, Yevgeny Rein, Nikolay Rubtsov, Yuri Druzhnikov, Ilya Ehrenburg, Alexander Woronski, and Grigory Danilevsky. Piotr Fast is the author of the volume of poetry  (On the Line. Poems) (2002), executive editor of the book series  (Studies on Translation), the quarterly  (Russian Studies Review) and the series  (Library of Russian Studies Review).

He is a member of the Slavic Studies Committee at the Polish Academy of Sciences, the International Comparative Literature Association and the Literary Translators Association, the chairman of the Translation Committee of the International Committee of Slavists. Piotr Fast has received the award of the Minister of National Education and has been decorated with Bronze, Silver and Gold Crosses of Merit, KEN Medal, Medal of Alexander Pushkin and the Gold Badge of Merit of the University of Silesia.

Publications:

  (1929–1941) (Poetics of Russian Production Novel (1929–1941)) (1981)
  (Parabolic Current in Ilya Erenburg's prose. Between Poetics and Interpretation) (1987)
  ("Master and Margarita" by Bulgakov. Writer, Epoch, Novel) (1991)
  (Erenburg and Contexts. Studies in the Poetics and History of Russian Literature) (1992)
  (From Thaw to Perestroika. Studies and Sketches on the Latest Russian Literature) (1992)
  (Meetings with Brodsky) (1996)
 Ideology, Aesthetics, Literary History. The Socialist Realism and its Others (1999)
  (Meetings with Brodsky (the Old and the New)) (2000)
  (Socialist Realism in Russian Literature. Doctrine, Poetics, Contexts) (2003)
  (Early Works of Anatoly Kim. Selected Issues of Poetics and Interpretation) (with Katarzyna Jastrzebska, 2006)
  (You Can't Understand Russia... Sketches about Books) (2010)
  (Translatological Expeditions and Walks) (with Alina Swiesciak, 2010)

References

External links 
 Polish Literary Translators Association

1951 births
Living people
Academic staff of the University of Silesia in Katowice
Recipients of the Gold Cross of Merit (Poland)
Writers from Warsaw
Polish translation scholars